Ray Antone Medeiros (May 9, 1926 – June 6, 2003) was a pinch runner in Major League Baseball. He played for the Cincinnati Reds.

References

External links

1926 births
2003 deaths
Cincinnati Reds players
Boise Pilots players
Baseball players from Oakland, California
Columbia Reds players
Ogden Reds players
Trenton Spartans players